Ivan Kostov Nikolov (Bulgarian: Иван Костов Николов) (December 24, 1913 (O.S.) in Plovdiv, Bulgaria – March 31, 2004 in Sofia, Bulgaria) was a Bulgarian geologist, mineralogist and crystallographer.

Honors and recognitions 

 President of the International Mineralogical Association (1982–1986)
 Honorary Fellow of the Geological Society of London
 Honorary Member of the Mineralogical Society of Great Britain and Ireland
 Honorary Member of the German Academy of Sciences Leopoldina
 Foreign Honorary Member of the Russian Mineralogical Society
 Foreign Member of the USSR Academy of Sciences
 Founder and Honorary President  of  the Bulgarian Mineralogical Society
 Doctor Honoris Causa  of the Bulgarian Academy of Sciences
 Honorary citizen of Plovdiv
 The Institute of Mineralogy and Crystallography at the Bulgarian Academy of Sciences was named after him.
 The mineral kostovite was named in his honour.
 A genus of cretaceous ammonites was named in his honour.

Selected publications

References

External links

See also 

 List of minerals recognized by the International Mineralogical Association
Sigmund Zois

1913 births
2004 deaths
Bulgarian mineralogists
Crystallographers
Bulgarian geologists
Members of the Bulgarian Academy of Sciences
Sofia University alumni
Alumni of Imperial College London
Scientists from Plovdiv
20th-century geologists
Burials at Central Sofia Cemetery
Presidents of the International Mineralogical Association